Joseph Edgar Blanchard (December 7, 1928 – March 22, 2012) was an American football player, professional wrestler and promoter. His son is original Four Horseman member Tully Blanchard and his granddaughter is former Impact Champion Tessa Blanchard.

Gridiron football career

He played his first three seasons of professional football with the Edmonton Eskimos in the Canadian Football League, eventually playing in the 1952 Grey Cup, a 21–11 loss to the Toronto Argonauts.

His teammates included future pro wrestling stars Gene Kiniski and Wilbur Snyder, along with Ted Tully.

His last football season was with the Calgary Stampeders in 1954.

Professional wrestling career
In 1953, Blanchard made his debut in pro wrestling in Calgary for Stampede Wrestling. Within all the territories he wrestled, he had the most success in Hawaii for 50th State Big Time Wrestling (twice winning the NWA Hawaii Tag Team Championship with Lord James Blears) and in Texas for NWA Big Time Wrestling (twice winning the NWA Texas Heavyweight Championship). 

In 1978, Blanchard founded Southwest Championship Wrestling (SCW) in San Antonio, where he retired from active competition later that year after 25 years. Blanchard ran the promotion until selling it to Fred Behrend in April 1985, changing its name to Texas All-Star Wrestling (TAW). In 1989, he joined the American Wrestling Association (AWA), replacing Stanley Blackburn as President of the company. He would remain with the promotion until its closure in 1991.

Death
Joe Blanchard died of squamous-cell carcinoma on March 22, 2012. He was 83.

Championship and Accomplishments
50th State Big Time Wrestling
NWA Hawaii Tag Team Championship (2 times) - with Lord James Blears
George Tragos/Lou Thesz Professional Wrestling Hall of Fame
Class of 2016
NWA Big Time Wrestling
NWA Texas Heavyweight Championship (2 times)

See also
List of professional wrestling promoters

References

1928 births
2012 deaths
American male professional wrestlers
Edmonton Elks players
Kansas State Wildcats football players
People from Haskell, Oklahoma
Professional wrestlers from Oklahoma
Professional wrestling promoters
Deaths from squamous cell carcinoma of skin
Stampede Wrestling alumni
Players of American football from San Antonio
Players of Canadian football from San Antonio
20th-century professional wrestlers